Senator Maddox may refer to:

Gene Maddox (1938–2015), Iowa State Senate
John W. Maddox (1848–1922), Georgia State Senate

See also
Jared Maddux (1911–1971), Tennessee State Senate